The Entomologist's Gazette is a British entomological journal. It contains articles and notes on the biology, ecology, distribution, taxonomy and systematics of all orders of insects, but with a bias towards Lepidoptera.
It is produced quarterly and was first published in 1950. Although originally restricted to the entomological fauna of Great Britain and Ireland, in the 1970s it extended its scope to cover the Palearctic region as a whole. Originally published by E. W. Classey 1950–1990; Gem Publishing 1991–2006; since 2007 published by Pemberley Books.

References

1950 establishments in the United Kingdom
Entomology journals and magazines
Magazines established in 1950
Quarterly magazines published in the United Kingdom
Science and technology magazines published in the United Kingdom